Klaus Härö (born 31 March 1971 in Porvoo, Finland) is a Finnish film director. In 2004, he won Finland's State Prize for Art.

Härö grew up in a Swedish-speaking Finnish family. He studied directing and attended screen writing seminars at the University of Industrial Arts in Helsinki. He has directed several feature films, including Elina: As If I Wasn't There (2003), Mother of Mine (2005) and The New Man (2007), as well as documentaries and short films. He works in both Sweden and Finland.

In 2003 Klaus Härö received the Ingmar Bergman Award, the winner of which was chosen by Ingmar Bergman himself. Four of Härö's features were chosen as Finland's submission for the best foreign-language film category at the Oscars.

Films
Elina: As If I Wasn't There (2003)
Mother of Mine (2005)
The New Man (2007)
Letters to Father Jacob (2009)
The Fencer (2015)
One Last Deal (2018)
Life After Death (2020)
My Sailor, My Love (2022)

See also
List of Finnish submissions for the Academy Award for Best Foreign Language Film

References

External links

1971 births
Living people
People from Porvoo
Swedish-speaking Finns
Finnish film directors
Aalto University School of Arts, Design and Architecture alumni